The Cathedral of the Most Blessed Sacrament is a Neo-Gothic style Roman Catholic cathedral church in the United States. It is the seat of the archbishop of the Roman Catholic Archdiocese of Detroit. The metropolitan archdiocese for the Roman Catholic Ecclesiastical Province of Detroit includes all dioceses in the state of Michigan; in addition, in 2000 the archdiocese accepted pastoral responsibility for the Roman Catholic Church in the Cayman Islands, which consists of Saint Ignatius Parish on Grand Cayman (the Archdiocese of Kingston maintains a mission sui iuris jurisdiction over the Cayman Islands). The cathedral is located at 9844 Woodward Avenue in Detroit, Michigan, adjacent to Detroit's Boston-Edison Historic District. The cathedral was listed on the National Register of Historic Places in 1982.

History
Most Blessed Sacrament parish was established in 1905 in what was then the northern city limits of Detroit. The parish was initially plagued with financial problems. Construction of the church started in 1913, but proceeded rather slowly. The interior was finished in 1930, with the dedication of the interior on Thanksgiving of that year. Detroit was elevated to an archdiocese in 1937, and Most Blessed Sacrament was chosen to be the cathedral church replacing St. Patrick's which served as cathedral since 1890. However, construction of the exterior, including the twin towers on the west facade and the flèche at the crossing, was not completed until 1951, coinciding with the 250th anniversary of Detroit's founding. The consecration on November 17, 1951, was broadcast live on local television. Plans also called for spires topping the towers, however these remain unbuilt.  Starting in 1985, and lasting until the early 2000s, Gunnar Birkerts, a well-known local architect was commissioned to redesign the interior of the cathedral, as well as designing the furniture for the papal visit, some of which is still in existence at the cathedral.

Architecture

The cathedral's architect was Henry A. Walsh of Cleveland, Ohio, who designed the cathedral in a Norman Gothic style.  Due to the length of the construction, Walsh was unable to see the project to completion, and Detroit architect George Diehl was chosen to succeed him for the construction of the towers in 1950. The building's exterior is made of Ohio sandstone, with Indiana limestone used for buttress facings, traceries, and doorways. The cathedral includes external and internal  statuary by sculptor Corrado Parducci.

In 2001, Gunnar Birkerts was selected to update the cathedral. Changes included a plaza on the north side of the structure, reconfigured interior spaces, a new sanctuary, cathedra, baptismal font and organ. The original organ was installed the west gallery by Casavant Frères in 1925 as a gift from Frederick Fisher of Fisher Body. During the renovations, this three manual/50 rank instrument was restored and a second organ was installed in the apse.

The new organ is opus 2785 of Austin Organs, Inc. with two manuals and 32 ranks and is connected to the gallery organ allowing them to be played as one instrument from the new console. The new organ was first played at the rededication ceremony March 25, 2003.

Papal visit of 1987
Although Pope John Paul II's 1987 visit to the United States originally included only stops in the southern and western parts of the country, Detroit's cardinal archbishop, Edmund Szoka, campaigned for him to include the Detroit area. Szoka made a direct request to the Pope during a visit to Vatican City. In addition to Archbishop Szoka's personal appeal, the Vatican realized there was no scheduled meeting with permanent deacons, and the Pope would not have given a major address on social justice, which he did at Hart Plaza.  The Pope arrived in Detroit on September 18, 1987, and spoke before large crowds in Hamtramck, to permanent deacons from across the United States at Ford Auditorium, adjacent to Hart Plaza and the Pontiac Silverdome. During John Paul II's visit, he visited guests at the cathedral and lodged at the adjacent archbishop's residence.

See also

List of Catholic cathedrals in the United States
List of cathedrals in the United States

References

Further reading

External links

 Official Cathedral Site
 Roman Catholic Archdiocese of Detroit Official Site

Roman Catholic churches in Detroit
Gothic Revival church buildings in Michigan
Churches in the Roman Catholic Archdiocese of Detroit
Churches on the National Register of Historic Places in Michigan
Most Blessed Sacrament, Cathedral of the
Christian organizations established in 1905
Buildings with sculpture by Corrado Parducci
Roman Catholic churches completed in 1915
1905 establishments in Michigan
National Register of Historic Places in Detroit
20th-century Roman Catholic church buildings in the United States